Frodingham may refer to:

Appleby Frodingham F.C., football club based in Scunthorpe, Lincolnshire, England
Appleby Frodingham Railway Preservation Society, based at Scunthorpe in Lincolnshire
Appleby-Frodingham Steel Company, formed in 1912 by a take over of the Appleby Ironworks by the Frodingham Ironworks
Frodingham, Lincolnshire, a former hamlet, area of Scunthorpe
Frodingham railway station, railway station in Scunthorpe, Lincolnshire
North Frodingham, village and civil parish in the East Riding of Yorkshire, England
North Frodingham railway station, was to have been a station on the proposed North Holderness Light Railway